The 2022–23 San Diego Toreros men's basketball team represented the University of San Diego during the 2022–23 NCAA Division I men's basketball season. The Toreros were led by first-year head coach Steve Lavin They played their home games at Jenny Craig Pavilion in San Diego, California as members of the West Coast Conference.

Previous season
The Toreros finished the 2021–22 season 15–16, 7–9 in WCC play to finish in seventh place. They defeated Pepperdine in the first round of the WCC tournament before losing to Portland in the second round.

Offseason
On March 6, 2022, the school fired head coach Sam Scholl. On April 8, the school hired former UCLA and St. John's head coach Steve Lavin as the team's new head coach. Lavin had not coached since 2015.

Departures

Incoming transfers

2022 recruiting class

Roster

Schedule and results

|-
!colspan=12 style=| Non-conference regular season

|-
!colspan=12 style=| WCC regular season

|-
!colspan=12 style=| WCC tournament

Source:

References

San Diego Toreros men's basketball seasons
San Diego
San Diego Toreros
San Diego Toreros